Mohamed Khider (March 13, 1912, Biskra, Algeria – January 4, 1967, Madrid, Spain) was an Algerian politician.

War years and imprisonment
Mohamed Khider was one of the original leaders of the Front de Libération nationale (FLN), having been previously active in its nationalist predecessors, the Étoile Nord-Africaine and Parti du Peuple Algerien (PPA) of Messali Hadj. From 1946 to 1951 he was a member of the French National Assembly as a representative of the Movement for the Triumph of Democratic Liberties (MTLD). He played an important role during the first years of the Algerian War of Independence (1954–62), mainly in representing the FLN externally. In 1956, he was part of a group of FLN politicians (Khider, Ahmad Ben Bella, Hocine Aït Ahmed, Mohamed Boudiaf and Rabah Bitat) captured by France in an airplane hijacking. Two years later, while incarcerated in France, he was an elected member of the GPRA exile government, holding the symbolical post of Minister of State. He was released as Algeria became independent in 1962.

Backing and opposing Ben Bella
After returning to Algeria, Khider joined Ahmed Ben Bella and the FLN army's chief of staff, Col. Houari Boumédiène, in forming a Political Bureau of the FLN to replace the GPRA, over which they had no control. Boumédiène's army, built up outside the war zone in Morocco and Tunisia, quashed resistance among GPRA loyalists and guerrilla units inside Algeria, as it moved in from its border area bases.

Khider then took on the role as Secretary-General of the post-war Party of FLN, with control over finances, but quickly fell out with President Ben Bella. Among the causes were political differences, personal rivalries, and opposition to Ben Bella's increasingly autocratic rule. Ben Bella refused Khider's requests to allow the FLN into the decision-making process, and replaced him as secretary-general.

Exile and death
In 1963, Khider went into exile in Switzerland, bringing $12 million (or $14 million) of party funds with him, saying they would be used to finance a political opposition to continue the "genuine" nationalist tradition of the FLN. In 1967, he was assassinated in Madrid, Spain. Most observers blamed his death on Col. Boumédiène, who had toppled Ben Bella two years earlier, and to whom Khider had declared his continued opposition.

He was posthumously rehabilitated by Boumédiène's successor, Chadli Bendjedid, in 1984.

See also
List of unsolved murders

References

External links
 Time Magazine, January 13, 1967 - Death notice.

1912 births
1967 deaths
20th-century Algerian politicians
Algerian exiles
Algerian people imprisoned abroad
Algerian People's Party politicians
Assassinated Algerian politicians
Deputies of the 1st National Assembly of the French Fourth Republic
Étoile Nord-Africaine politicians
Government ministers of Algeria
Male murder victims
Movement for the Triumph of Democratic Liberties politicians
National Liberation Front (Algeria) politicians
People from Biskra
People murdered in Spain
People of French Algeria
Prisoners and detainees of France
Unsolved murders in Spain